Jean-Marie Olivon (born 2 February 1967) is a French former water polo player. He competed in the men's tournament at the 1992 Summer Olympics.

See also
 France men's Olympic water polo team records and statistics
 List of men's Olympic water polo tournament goalkeepers

References

External links
 

1967 births
Living people
French male water polo players
Water polo goalkeepers
Olympic water polo players of France
Water polo players at the 1992 Summer Olympics
Water polo players from Marseille